Flight 60 may refer to:

All Nippon Airways Flight 60, crashed on 4 February 1966
Biman Bangladesh Airlines Flight 60, crashed on 8 May 2019

0060